William "Willie" Eugene Stinnett III (born December 17, 1985) is a Guamanian basketball player. He is a point guard for the Guam national basketball team.

High school and college
Stinnett graduated from Father Dueñas Memorial School in Guam in 2004. He subsequently moved to the United States, where he played two seasons of college basketball for Wenatchee Valley College. His sophomore year was cut short after he sustained a season-ending injury in December 2005. He later played college basketball in the Philippines as well.

Professional career
In September 2015, Stinnett auditioned for the Hawke's Bay Hawks and other teams during a tour of New Zealand that followed Guam's bronze medal performance at the 2015 FIBA 3x3 Oceania Championships in Australia. The tryout was successful, and in December 2015, he signed with the Hawks for the 2016 New Zealand NBL season. He appeared in 17 of the Hawks' 18 games in 2016, averaging 7.6 points, 4.4 rebounds and 2.1 assists per game.

National team career
Stinnett made his debut for the Guam national basketball team in 2005. In July 2015, he captained Team Guam to the gold medal at the Pacific Games in Port Moresby, Papua New Guinea. In the gold-medal match against Fiji, Stinnett recorded 18 points, seven rebounds, two assists and one steal in a 78–61 win.

References

External links
 Will Stinnett at pg2015.gems.pro
 Will Stinnett signs contract to play professional basketball
 Will Stinnett: A special pair of XX8's

1985 births
Living people
Guamanian men's basketball players
Hawke's Bay Hawks players
Point guards